Prime Bank (Gambia) Limited, commonly known as Prime Bank (Gambia), was a private commercial bank in the Gambia. It was the 12th commercial bank to be licensed in the country. The bank was a subsidiary of the now defunct Lebanese Canadian Bank (LCB).

History
The Lebanese Canadian Bank (LCB), the parent company of Prime Bank (Gambia), operated from 1968 through 1988 as a subsidiary of the Royal Bank of Canada Middle East.
LCB was among the top ten league banks in Lebanon, known as the Alpha Group, but was shut down after the intervention of the U.S. Law enforcement and regulatory community. Prime Bank (Gambia) was LCB's first African subsidiary. LCB has been working to set up a subsidiary sn in the Democratic Republic of the Congo (DRC). In January 2013, in light of US investigations, the investors in the institution decided to  close down the bank by withholding new capital injection, to meet new capital requirements by the Central Bank of The Gambia (CBG).

External links
Prime Bank (Gambia) Opened
List of licensed banks in the Gambia
Prime Bank (Gambia) Homepage

See also

List of banks in Gambia

References

Banks of the Gambia
Banks established in 2009
Serekunda